George Newenham Wright (c. 1794–1877) was an Irish writer and Anglican clergyman. He was born in Dublin; his father, John Thomas Wright was a doctor. He graduated B.A. from Trinity College Dublin in 1814 and M.A. in 1817, having been elected a Scholar of the College in 1812. He married Charlotte Mulock in 1819.

He held several curacies in Ireland before moving to St Mary Woolnoth, London.

By 1851, he was a teacher of classics, resident in Windsor with his wife. In 1861 he noted having a number of pupils boarding with him at Frome. By 1863 he was master of Tewkesbury Grammar School.

He died  on 24 March 1877 at Pierrepont Street, Bath.

From the 1820s to the 1840s some minor topographical works and schoolbooks on subjects ranging from the Greek language to biography and philosophy by Wright were published. There were several on Ireland, two of which have illustrations by George Petrie.

Works
1821: An Historical Guide to Ancient and Modern Dublin (Petrie, George, illustrator). London: Baldwin, Cradock, and Joy  (2nd ed 1825)
--do.-- An Historical Guide to the City of Dublin. Dublin: Four Courts Press, 1980 (Facsim of: 2nd edition published London: Baldwin, Cradock and Joy, 1825)
1822: A Guide to the Lakes of Killarney
1827: A Guide to the County of Wicklow 
1831: Ireland Illustrated 
1833: Scenes in North Wales. London: T. T. & J. Tegg; reissued: 
1834: Scenes in Ireland. London: Thomas Tegg and Son; Glasgow: R. Griffin and Co.; Dublin: W.F. Wakeman
1843: China (Allom, Thomas, illustrator) London: Fisher, Son & Co.
--do.-- The Chinese Empire illustrated. London : London Printing & Publishing Co., [1858, 59.]. 
--do.-- --do.-- (reissued) Hong Kong: John Nicholson, 1988. 
1851: Belgium, the Rhine, Italy, Greece, and the shores and islands of the Mediterranean: illustrated in a series of ... engravings ... (text by) G. N. Wright & L. F. A. Buckingham. 2 vols. London: Peter Jackson
The Historic Guide to Bath published in 1864 by R E Peach of 8 Bridge Street, Bath

References

1790s births
1877 deaths
19th-century Irish Anglican priests
Irish writers
Scholars of Trinity College Dublin